Roland G. Usher, Junior (3 May 1880, Lynn, Massachusetts - 21 March 1957, St. Louis, Missouri was a historian active in the twentieth century.

Roland was named after his grandfather Roland G. Usher. His father was Edward Preston Usher and his mother, Adela Louise Payson. On 9 June 1910, he married Florence Wyman Richardson, with whom he had at least four children.

Selected publications
 1905 The Presbyterian movement in the reign of Queen Elizabeth as illustrated by the Minute book of the Dedham classis, 1582-1589
 1913 Pan-Germanism
 1914 Pan-Germanism, from its inception to the outbreak of the war, a critical study
 1943 The Civil Administration of the British Navy During the American Revolution

References

1880 births
1957 deaths
20th-century American historians